The 1892 Idaho gubernatorial election was held on November 8, 1892.

Acting Governor Norman Bushnell Willey was defeated for renomination at the Republican convention.

Republican nominee William J. McConnell defeated Democratic nominee John M. Burke and Populist nominee Abraham J. Crook with 40.74% of the vote.

Nominations
Nominations were made by party conventions.

Democratic nomination
The Democratic convention was held on August 25 and 26 at Boise. John M. Burke was nominated on the tenth ballot.

Candidates
John M. Ballentine
John M. Burke
Edward A. Stevenson, former Territorial Governor

Results

Results of the balloting were as follows:

Republican nomination
The Republican convention was held on August 18 and 19 at Moscow. William J. McConnell was nominated on the second ballot.

Candidates
William J. McConnell, former U.S. Senator
A. B. Moss
Wells
N. B. Willey, acting Governor

Results

Results of the balloting were as follows:

People's Party nomination
The People's Party convention was held on August 18 at Boise. A. J. Crook was nominated on the first ballot.

Candidates
A. J. Crook

Results

General election

Candidates
William J. McConnell, Republican
John M. Burke, Democratic
Abraham J. Crook, People's
Joseph A. Clark, Prohibition

Results

References

Notes

Bibliography
 
 

1892
Idaho
Gubernatorial
November 1892 events